Downard is a surname. Notable people with the surname include:
Kelly Downard, Republican Councilman for the 16th District of Louisville Metro in Kentucky in the United States of America ...
Kevin Downard, Australian scientist
James Shelby Downard (1913–1998), American conspiracy theorist
Ryan Downard (born 1988), American football coach